The Ozark Southern Stone quarry is a quarry located in Elk Ranch, Arkansas, rich in dolomite limestone.

It began in 1883 as Eureka Stone Co., and remained open until the Great Depression.  It became Ozark Southern stone in 2006.

Its stone has been used in building in the northwest Arkansas region, in Kansas City, Missouri, and elsewhere.  It was used in the restoration of the Old Main building at the University of Arkansas campus in Fayetteville, Arkansas.

References

External links
 http://www.lovelycitizen.com/story/1465017.html

Geography of Carroll County, Arkansas
Quarries in the United States
Dolomite (rock)
Limestone industry
Mining in Arkansas